Angola has twelve public holidays that can be increased by bridge holidays if a holiday falls on a Tuesday or Thursday.  2022 has fifteen national holidays.

Notes

References

 
Angola
Angolan culture
Society of Angola
Holidays